Athersley Recreation Football Club is a football club based in Athersley, Barnsley, South Yorkshire, England. They are currently members of the Northern Counties East League Premier Division and play at Sheerien Park.

History
The club was formed in 1979 as Athersley North Juniors. In 1983–84 they finished third in Division Two of the Barnsley Nelson League and were promoted to Division One. After finishing as runners-up in Division One the following season, they switched to Division Two of the Barnsley Junior League for the 1985–86 season. Their first season in the new division saw them finish third, earning promotion to Division One. They were renamed Athersley Recreation in the summer of 1986.

After winning Division One in 1986–87, the club became members of Division One of the Barnsley Association League. They finished as runners-up in the following season, earning promotion to the Premier Division. The club went on to win back-to-back Premier Division titles in 1991–92 and 1992–93, and then three successive titles between 1995 and 1997. After their third title in 1996–97, the club moved up to Division Two of the Sheffield & Hallamshire County Senior League in 1997. They won the division in their first season in the league, earning promotion to Division One. The following season saw them finish as runners-up, resulting in promotion to the Premier Division. They subsequently won the Premier Division at the first attempt.

After three seasons in which they finished eighth, second and fourth, the club won the Premier Division again in 2003–04, starting a period of success that saw them win the title a further four times in the next eight seasons, finishing as runners-up on the other four occasions.

After winning their sixth Premier Division title in 2011–12, the club was promoted to Division One of the Northern Counties East League. Their first season in the new league saw them finish as runners-up, earning promotion to the Premier Division. In 2013–14 they entered the FA Vase for the first time, and a year later they made their FA Cup debut.

In May 2014 they won the Sheffield & Hallamshire Senior Cup for the first time, beating Frickley Athletic in the final at Hillsborough.

Season-by-season record

Ground
The club plays at Sheerien Park on Ollerton Road in Athersley. It has a capacity of 2,000, of which 420 is covered and 150 seated.

Honours
Sheffield & Hallamshire County Senior League
Champions 1999–2000, 2003–04, 2004–05, 2006–07, 2008–09, 2011–12
Division Two champions 1997–98
League Cup winners 1997–98, 2005–06, 2008–09
Barnsley Association League
Champions 1991–92, 1992–93, 1994–95, 1995–96, 1996–97
Barnsley Junior League
Champions 1986–87
Sheffield & Hallamshire Senior Cup
Winners 2013–14
Sheffield & Hallamshire Association Cup
Winners 2007–08

Records
Best League performance: 10th, Northern Counties East League Premier Division, 2013–14
Best FA Cup performance: Preliminary round, 2014–15
Best FA Vase performance: Second Round, 2013–14

See also
Athersley Recreation F.C. players
Athersley Recreation F.C. managers

References

External links
Official website

 
Football clubs in England
Football clubs in South Yorkshire
Association football clubs established in 1979
Northern Counties East Football League
1979 establishments in England
Sport in Barnsley
Sheffield & Hallamshire County Senior Football League
Sheffield & Hallamshire County FA members
Barnsley Association League